The Gerard Carter Community Center is a facility located in Staten Island, New York.  Its main basketball court is home to the Staten Island Vipers of the American Basketball Association (ABA).

References

External links
 

Buildings and structures in Staten Island
Sports venues in Staten Island
Basketball venues in New York City
2011 establishments in New York City
Sports venues completed in 2011